This is a list of films produced or distributed by the American studio Tiffany Pictures between 1922 and 1933. Tiffany was one of the dominant independent companies during the early studio era, and its releases were popular with audiences. In 1932 the company was absorbed into the short-lived Sono Art company, which handled its remaining releases.

1920s

1930s

See also
 List of Chesterfield Pictures films
 List of Monogram Pictures films
 List of Producers Releasing Corporation films
 List of Republic Pictures films

References

Bibliography
 Michael R. Pitts. Poverty Row Studios, 1929-1940: An Illustrated History of 55 Independent Film Companies, with a Filmography for Each. McFarland & Company, 2005.

Tiffany Pictures films
Tiffany Pictures
Tiffany Pictures